Menkin is the surname of the following notable people:
Dani Menkin (born 1970), Los Angeles-based writer, director, and film producer
David Menkin, Norwegian actor
Miriam Menkin (1901–1992), American scientist

See also
Menken